Bugulidae is a family of bryozoans belonging to the order Cheilostomatida.

Genera
The World Register of Marine Species lists the following genera:-

Beanodendria d'Hondt & Gordon, 1996
Bicellariella Levinsen, 1909
Bicellarina Levinsen, 1909
Brettiella Gordon, 1984
Bugula Oken, 1815
Bugularia Levinsen, 1909
Bugulella Verrill, 1879
Bugulina Gray, 1848
Bugulopsis Verrill, 1880
Calyptozoum Harmer, 1926
Camptoplites Harmer, 1923
Carolanna Gordon, 2021
Caulibugula Verrill, 1900
Cornucopina Levinsen, 1909
Corynoporella Hincks, 1888
Crisularia Gray, 1848
Cuneiforma d'Hondt & Schopf, 1985
Dendrobeania Levinsen, 1909
Dimetopia Busk, 1852
Falsibugulella Liu, 1984
Farciminellopsis Silén, 1941
Halophila Gray, 1843
Himantozoum Harmer, 1923
Himantozoumella d'Hondt & Schopf, 1985
Kinetoskias Danielssen, 1868
Klugella Hastings, 1943
Luguba Gordon, 1984
Nordgaardia Kluge, 1962
Semidendrobeania d'Hondt & Schopf, 1985
Semikinetoskias Silén, 1941
Sessibugula Osburn, 1950
Thaminozoum d'Hondt & Gordon, 1996
Uschakovia Kluge, 1946
Virididentula Fehlauer-Ale, Winston, Tilbrook, Nascimento & Vieira, 2015
Xenoflustra Moyano, 2011

References

Bryozoan families